Steven Ferguson (born 1 April 1982) is a Scottish footballer.

Career
Ferguson started his career at East Fife, scoring six goals in 11 appearances. He then made the move to Premier League club Tottenham Hotspur, where he would not make a single appearance. During his time at Spurs he was loaned out to Scottish club Motherwell, where he would make 19 appearances (11 from the bench) and scored two goals, including the last goal in the 6–1 win over Hearts at Fir Park.

In 2003, he was released by Tottenham and joined Woking, where he would spend the majority of his career, making 113 appearances and scoring 19 goals.

External links

Living people
1982 births
Scottish footballers
East Fife F.C. players
Motherwell F.C. players
Tottenham Hotspur F.C. players
Woking F.C. players
Thurrock F.C. players
Scottish Premier League players
Scottish Football League players
National League (English football) players
Association football forwards